Chamguava is a genus of the botanical family Myrtaceae, first described as a genus in 1991. It is native to southern Mexico and Central America.

Species
 Chamguava gentlei (Lundell) Landrum - Chiapas, Belize, Guatemala, Honduras
 Chamguava musarum (Standl. & Steyerm.) Landrum - Guatemala
 Chamguava schippii (Standl.) Landrum - Guerrero, Chiapas, Belize, Guatemala, Panama

References

Myrtaceae
Myrtaceae genera